Dedrick D'Mon Rolison (born August 9, 1971), better known by his stage name Mack 10, is an American rapper. He has sold nearly 11 million records combining his solo and group works. Mack 10 made his first appearance on Ice Cube's 1994 "Bootlegs & B-Sides" compilation on the remixed track "What Can I Do?" and was a member of hip hop supergroup Westside Connection along with WC and Ice Cube. Mack 10 is also this creator of independent record label Hoo-Bangin' Records and made his stage name with the Ingram MAC-10 submachine gun.

Career
Mack 10 made his first appearance on Ice Cube's "Bootlegs & B-Sides" compilation on the track "What Can I Do? (Remix)"

His debut, gold selling album Mack 10 was released in 1995 on the Priority label. He made his hip hop debut with the hit single, "Foe Life", off his self-titled album. His next two releases "Based on a True Story" (1997) and "The Recipe" (1998) also reached gold certification and peaked at No. 14 and No. 15 on the Billboard 200, respectively.

Rolison is also the founder of independent record label Hoo-Bangin Records. He appeared with W.C. and Ice Cube in the 1996 all-star side project Westside Connection, and formed his own production company, Mack One-O, which signed the acts Allfrumtha-I and the Comrades. Mack 10 also signed Glasses Malone to his Hoo-Bangin Records imprint through Cash Money Records.

His most recent album, 2009's Soft White was released on Hoo-Bangin' Records and Fontana Distribution. The first single was "Big Balla" featuring Birdman and Glasses Malone.

Feuds
Mack 10 was involved in numerous feuds including with the rapper Common in the song "Westside Slaughterhouse" featured the rapper Ice Cube in his critically acclaimed self-titled album, the diss was a response to the song named "I Used to Love H.E.R." by Common. Earlier on, in 1996, when Mack 10 was a member in the rap supergroup Westside Connection, he was featured in the song "King of the Hill" by Ice Cube - a diss song directed to the rap group named Cypress Hill. WC (a member of the rap supergroup Westside Connection) did not want to participate in the feud so as not to ruin his long-lasted relationship with Cypress Hill. The feud was later squashed by both parties.

Personal life 
Rolison married Tionne "T-Boz" Watkins, from R&B trio TLC during August 2000. However they became separated during 2004. And they have a daughter, Chase Anela Rolison, born during October 2000.

Discography

Studio albums
 Mack 10 (1995)
 Based on a True Story (1997)
 The Recipe (1998)
 The Paper Route (2000)
 Bang or Ball (2001)
 Ghetto, Gutter & Gangsta (2003)
 Hustla's Handbook (2005)
 Soft White (2009)

Collaboration albums
 Bow Down with Westside Connection (1996) 
 Da Hood with Da Hood (2002) 
 Terrorist Threats with Westside Connection (2003)
 Money Music with Glasses Malone (2010)

Tours
 Up In Smoke Tour (co-act)

Filmography

Video game appearances
Mack 10 is a playable character in the video game Def Jam: Fight for NY.

References

External links

1971 births
Male actors from Los Angeles
American male film actors
African-American male rappers
West Coast hip hop musicians
Cash Money Records artists
Priority Records artists
Rappers from Los Angeles
African-American male actors
Living people
Gangsta rappers
G-funk artists
21st-century American rappers
Westside Connection members
21st-century American male musicians
Bloods
21st-century African-American musicians
20th-century African-American people